Bawaka is a village in the commune of Ngaoui in the Adamawa Region of Cameroon, near the border with the Central African Republic.

Population 
In 1967, Bawaka contained 420 inhabitants, mostly Wodaabe and Gbaya people

In the 2005 census, 1804 people were counted there.

References

Bibliography
 Jean Boutrais, Peuples et cultures de l'Adamaoua (Cameroun) : actes du colloque de Ngaoundéré du 14 au 16 janvier 1992, Éd. de l'ORSTOM, Paris, 1993
 Dictionnaire des villages de l'Adamaoua, ONAREST, Yaoundé, October 1974, 133 p.

External links
 Ngaoui , on the website Communes et villes unies du Cameroun (CVUC)

Populated places in Adamawa Region